Algarveneta is a monotypic genus of southern European sheet weavers containing the single species, Algarveneta corona. It was first described by J. Wunderlich in 2021, and it has only been found in Portugal.

See also
 List of Linyphiidae species (A–H)

References

Monotypic Linyphiidae genera
Endemic arthropods of Portugal